The 1995 Deutsche Tourenwagen Meisterschaft was the twelfth season of premier German touring car championship, the tenth season under the moniker of Deutsche Tourenwagen Meisterschaft and also the first season under International Touring Car Series moniker due to transition, both open to FIA Class 1 Touring Cars. The two series were contested by the same cars, teams and drivers with Bernd Schneider winning both drivers titles and Mercedes-Benz winning both manufacturers awards.

Teams and drivers

Schedule and results

Driver Standings/results

Deutsche Tourenwagen Meisterschaft Championship
Points system is as follows: 1st=20, 2nd=15, 3rd=12, 4th=10, 5th=8, 6th=6, 7th=4, 8th=3, 9th=2, 10th=1

† Drivers did not finish the race, but were classified as they completed over 90% of the race distance.

Deutsche Tourenwagen Meisterschaft Manufacturers Championship

International Touring Car Series
Points system is as follows: 1st=20, 2nd=15, 3rd=12, 4th=10, 5th=8, 6th=6, 7th=4, 8th=3, 9th=2, 10th=1

† Drivers did not finish the race, but were classified as they completed over 90% of the race distance.

International Touring Car Series Manufacturers Championship

External links
 Official DTM site
 FIA results for the 1995 International Touring Car Series

Deutsche Tourenwagen Masters seasons
1995 in German motorsport